The Tiruchanda Viruttam is a Tamil Vaishnava work composed by the poet-saint Tirumalisai Alvar, comprising 120 pasurams (hymns). It is a part of the Naalayira Divya Prabandham, the Sri Vaishnava canon of the Alvars. It is dedicated to the veneration of Vishnu, as well as his forms and incarnations, such as Krishna and Venkateshvara.

Hymns 

In the work, Tirumalisai Alvar offers a detailed account of the life of Krishna, his slaying of asuras, his subjugation of bulls to marry Nappinnai, as well as his role in the Kurukshetra War.

One of his hymns indicates Krishna's triumph over Kamsa, the deity's act of sucking the poisoned milk of Putana, as well as the three strides of Vamana: 

It is speculated that Kambar, who wrote the Kamba Ramayanam, may have taken inspiration from some of the hymns of this work:

See also 

 Tirupalliyeḻuchi
 Amalanatipiran
 Tirumālai

References

External links 
 Tiruchanda Viruttam Of Tirumalisai Alvar English Translation And Notes By BSS Iyengar

Naalayira Divya Prabandham
Tamil Hindu literature
Vaishnava texts